"To a Butterfly" is a lyric poem written by William Wordsworth at Town End, Grasmere, in 1802. It was first published in the collection Poems, in Two Volumes in 1807.

Wordsworth wrote two poems addressing a butterfly, of which this is the first and best known. In the poem, he recalls how he and his sister Dorothy would chase butterflies as children when they were living together in Cockermouth, before they were separated following their mother's death in 1778 when he was barely eight years old.

History

The "Emmeline" of the poem is Wordsworth's sister Dorothy.

The day before Wordsworth had been walking with Dorothy, and on their way back he had begun a poem that eventually became "Beggars". That evening Dorothy read to him her account in her journal of the incident that had inspired the poem, but on this occasion that proved to be unfortunate because he could not rid himself of her words and was unable to finish it. However, as Dorothy's journal entry shows, the next morning he was able to complete it as well as start and finish "To a Butterfly", remembering their childhood days together.

The poem was placed in a section of Poems, in Two Volumes entitled "Moods of my Mind", in which he grouped together his most deeply felt lyrics. Others included "The Sparrow's Nest", in which he says of Dorothy "[S]he gave me eyes, she gave me ears", and "I Wandered Lonely as a Cloud", based closely on an entry in Dorothy's journal following another walk together.

Sources

Bibliography
 Davies, Hunter. William Wordsworth, Weidenfeld and Nicolson 1980
 Gill, Stephen. William Wordsworth: A Life, Oxford University Press 1989
 Gill, Stephen. "William Wordsworth: The Major Works including The Prelude", Oxford University Press 1984
 Moorman, Mary. William Wordsworth, A Biography: The Early Years, 1770–1803 v. 1, Oxford University Press 1957
 Moorman, Mary. William Wordsworth: A Biography: The Later Years, 1803–50 v. 2, Oxford University Press 1965 
 Wordsworth, Dorothy (ed. Pamela Woof). The Grasmere and Alfoxden Journals., Oxford University Press 2002

Poetry by William Wordsworth
1802 poems